Scaggsville is an unincorporated community and census-designated place in Howard County, Maryland, United States. It is situated near the southeastern tip of Howard County, between Laurel and Fulton. As of the 2010 census it had a population of 24,333. The town mainly consists of residences, with some commercial establishments. Scaggsville generally falls within ZIP code 20723, assigned to Laurel, though the town formerly had its own post office.

At the 2000 census the Scaggsville area was counted as part of the North Laurel census-designated place.

History

The town is named for the Scaggs family, who settled  of farmland in the 1830s and continue to live in the region. The area also used the name "Hells Corner" as a postal address in Civil War times. The historic path running through town was shown on maps as far back as 1795. This path is now named Lime Kiln Road, Scaggsville Road, and Whiskey Bottom Road. In the 19th century, Scaggsville was a stagecoach stop on the trip from Washington, D.C., to Baltimore. Stagecoaches would ford the Patuxent River until a wooden bridge was built in 1859, which washed out in an 1868 flood. In 1877 the community built a second southern road between Water's store in Fulton to the Souder House near Laurel, now known as Stansfield, Harding and Murphy Road. Three additional bridges washed out by 1883 before a steel truss bridge was built. In 1941, the Maryland Gazette reported that the town consisted of 15 households. Today, it has grown to a suburban community made up of several neighborhoods.

Geography
Scaggsville is located in southern Howard County, bordered by Fulton to the west, Columbia to the north, North Laurel to the southeast, West Laurel in Prince George's County to the south, and Burtonsville in Montgomery County to the southwest. The Patuxent River forms the southern edge of the Scaggsville CDP, as well as the Howard County line. U.S. Route 29 follows the western edge of the CDP, leading north  to Columbia and south  to downtown Washington, D.C. Interstate 95 forms the eastern edge of the CDP, leading northeast  to downtown Baltimore and southwest  to Washington's Beltway.

Demographics

Name change efforts
Some residents have advocated changing the name of Scaggsville to Rocky Gorge, since the community borders the Rocky Gorge Reservoir (also known as the T. Howard Duckett Reservoir) on the Patuxent River. Efforts to change the name, however, have been unsuccessful.

See also
Partnership (Fulton, Maryland) – historic building also known as the "Moore House" (owned by Mrs. George Skaggs until 1958)
Souder House – Scaggsville corner store operated over 100 years.

References

Scaggsville, Maryland (MD) Community Profile.  HomeTownLocator.com. Retrieved on February 5, 2007.
Liz Steinberg. May 19, 2002. "Quiet Scaggsville is expecting to get quieter". Baltimoresun.com. Retrieved on February 5, 2007.

Census-designated places in Howard County, Maryland
Census-designated places in Maryland